Changle South railway station is a railway station in Changle District, Fuzhou, Fujian, China. It opened with the Fuzhou–Pingtan railway on 26 December 2020. This station was to be called Songxia (松下), but its name was changed prior to opening.

References

Railway stations in Fujian
Railway stations in China opened in 2020